Malacothrix coulteri is a species of flowering plant in the family Asteraceae known by the common name snake's head, or snake's head desertdandelion. It is native to the southwestern United States is also found in southern South America where it is an introduced species. Its native habitat includes desert, grassland, chaparral, and other open, sandy areas. It is an annual herb producing a waxy, upright flowering stem up to about 50 centimeters in maximum height. The leaves, which are mostly located near the base of the stem, are toothed or not. The inflorescence is an array of flower heads with nearly spherical involucres of scale-like phyllaries one to two centimeters wide. The bracts are green, often with dark striping or marking. The yellow or white ray florets are about a centimeter long.

References

External links
Jepson Manual Treatment
USDA Plants Profile
Photo gallery

coulteri
Flora of the Southwestern United States